Falseuncaria aberdarensis is a species of moth of the family Tortricidae. It is found in Kenya.

The wingspan is 11–13 mm. The forewings are greyish white, suffused with fuscous. The hindwings are brownish grey.

References

Endemic moths of Kenya
Moths described in 2010
Cochylini
Taxa named by Leif Aarvik